Jennifer Bertrand is the host of Home & Garden Television's Paint-Over! with Jennifer Bertrand and the season three champion of HGTV Design Star. Paint-Over! with Jennifer Bertrand is an hour-long show that showcases her decorative painting and murals. She will also be on the show HGTV Showdown, in which she will compete head-to-head with another HGTV designer. In addition to appearances and a hosting job on HGTV, Bertrand owns a design business with her husband in Weatherby Lake, Missouri.

References

External links
 Jennifer Bertrand biography on HGTV

Living people
American television personalities
American women television personalities
Year of birth missing (living people)